In Greek mythology, Iphianassa (Ancient Greek: Ίφιάνασσα Īphianassa means 'strong queen' or 'rule strongly') is a name that refers to several characters.

Iphianassa, one of the 50 Nereids, marine-nymph daughters of the 'Old Man of the Sea' Nereus and the Oceanid Doris.
 Iphianassa, consort of King Endymion of Elis and mother of Aetolus. The wife of Endymion was otherwise known as Asterodia, Chromia, Hyperippe or a nameless Naiad nymph.
 Iphianassa, one of the three maenadic daughters of the Argive king Proetus by Stheneboea who were purified of their madness by Melampus. Iphianassa eventually married Melampus.
Iphianassa, a Mycenaean princess as the daughter of King Agamemnon and Clytemnestra.
Iphianassa, mother of Menalces by Medon of Cilla. Her son was killed by Neoptolemus.

Notes

References 

 Apollodorus, The Library with an English Translation by Sir James George Frazer, F.B.A., F.R.S. in 2 Volumes, Cambridge, MA, Harvard University Press; London, William Heinemann Ltd. 1921. ISBN 0-674-99135-4. Online version at the Perseus Digital Library. Greek text available from the same website.
 Graves, Robert, The Greek Myths, Harmondsworth, London, England, Penguin Books, 1960. 
 Homer, The Iliad with an English Translation by A.T. Murray, Ph.D. in two volumes. Cambridge, MA., Harvard University Press; London, William Heinemann, Ltd. 1924. . Online version at the Perseus Digital Library.
 Homer, Homeri Opera in five volumes. Oxford, Oxford University Press. 1920. . Greek text available at the Perseus Digital Library.
 Lucian of Samosata, Dialogues of the Sea Gods translated by Fowler, H W and F G. Oxford: The Clarendon Press. 1905. Online version at theoi.com
 Luciani Samosatensis, Opera. Vol I. Karl Jacobitz. in aedibus B. G. Teubneri. Leipzig. 1896. Greek text available at the Perseus Digital Library.
 Pausanias, Description of Greece with an English Translation by W.H.S. Jones, Litt.D., and H.A. Ormerod, M.A., in 4 Volumes. Cambridge, MA, Harvard University Press; London, William Heinemann Ltd. 1918. . Online version at the Perseus Digital Library
 Pausanias, Graeciae Descriptio. 3 vols. Leipzig, Teubner. 1903.  Greek text available at the Perseus Digital Library.

Nereids
Princesses in Greek mythology
Queens in Greek mythology
Elean characters in Greek mythology
Mythology of Argos